Dancing on a Dime is a 1940 Paramount Pictures movie directed by Joseph Santley about five actors and dancers putting on a show while living in a theatre.  It is adapted from a novel of the same name written by Dorothy Young, which itself is based loosely on her own life.   It starred Robert Paige, Peter Lind Hayes, Eddie Quillan, Frank Jenks, and Grace McDonald.  It is known for its song, I Hear Music.

References

External links

1940 films
American black-and-white films
Films directed by Joseph Santley
American musical films
1940 musical films
Paramount Pictures films
1940s English-language films
1940s American films
Films with screenplays by Maurice Rapf